Events in the year 1944 in the British Mandate of Palestine.

Incumbents
 High Commissioner – Sir Harold MacMichael until 30 August; John Vereker, 6th Viscount Gort
 Emir of Transjordan – Abdullah I bin al-Hussein
 Prime Minister of Transjordan – Tawfik Abu al-Huda until 15 October; Samir al-Rifai

Events

 1 February – The Irgun proclaims a revolt against the British mandatory government.
 27 February – The Irgun bombs the income tax offices.
 15 March – World War II: Hannah Szenes and two male colleagues are parachuted by the British into Yugoslavia and join a partisan group.
 1 May – The British mandatory government restricts the immigration of Jews to Palestine.
 1 August – Fourth Assembly of Jewish Representatives elections held.
 8 August – Lehi members attempt to assassinate the High Commissioner, Sir Harold MacMichael.
 30 August – Sir John Vereker, 6th Viscount Gort assumes office as the High Commissioner of Palestine.
 20 September – World War II: The Jewish Brigade group of the British Army is established.
 19 October – Irgun and Lehi members are deported by the Mandate authorities to internment camps in Africa.
 November – The founding of the city Giv'at Shmuel.
 6 November – Lord Moyne, the British minister of state in the Middle East, is assassinated by Lehi members in Cairo.
 7 November – World War II: Hannah Szenes is executed in Hungary by a German firing squad.

Notable births
 6 January – Yair Rosenblum, Israeli composer (died 1996)
 9 February – Ze'ev Seltzer, Israeli footballer and football manager
 10 February – Assad Assad, Druze Israeli politician, diplomat, and military officer
 16 February – Gaby Mazor, Israeli archaeologist
 20 February – Yaakov Peri, Israeli politician and director of Shin Bet
 6 March – Michael Eitan, Israeli politician
 18 March – Amnon Lipkin-Shahak, 15th Chief of Staff of the IDF (died 2012)
 19 March – Sirhan Sirhan, assassin of Robert F. Kennedy
 4 April – Yehudit Naot, Israeli scientist and politician (died 2004)
 4 April – Alex Odeh, Palestinian Christian and Arab-American activist (died 1985)
 9 April – Leila Khaled, Palestinian Arab, member of the Popular Front for the Liberation of Palestine (PFLP) who is best known for hijacking airplanes
7 April – Oshik Levi, Israeli singer and actor
 19 April – Yehuda Weinstein, Israeli lawyer, Attorney General of Israel 
 20 May – Matan Vilnai, Israeli politician and former Major General in the IDF
 26 May – Israel Segal, Israeli writer and journalist (died 2007)
 29 May – Avraham Melamed, Israeli swimmer, competed at the 1964 Summer Olympics and 1968 Summer Olympics, won two silver medals in the 1966 Asian Games
 10 June – Yona Wallach, Israeli poet (died 1985)
 16 June – Avigdor Kahalani, former Israeli politician and former Brigadier General in the IDF
 19 June – Yona Yahav, Israeli lawyer and politician, former mayor of Haifa
 22 June – Edna Arbel, Israeli jurist and judge on the Israeli Supreme Court
23 June – Alex Levac, Israeli photojournalist and street photographer
 20 July – Yoram Ben-Zeev, Israeli diplomat
 10 September – Eitan Ben Eliyahu, Israeli general, commander of the Israeli Air Force
 26 August – Ron Huldai, Israeli politician, former Israeli Air Force fighter pilot and the current mayor of Tel Aviv
 29 August – Yoram Yair, Israeli general
 19 September – Ephraim Sneh, Israeli politician and former Brigadier General in the IDF
 1 October – Dror Kashtan, Israeli football manager
 16 October – Roni Brizon, Israeli politician
 24 October – Yaacov Shavit, Israeli historian
 27 November – Aryeh Stern, Israeli rabbi, Ashkenazi Chief Rabbi of Jerusalem and member of the Chief Rabbinate of Israel
 6 December – Arnon Milchan, Israeli film producer
 Full date unknown
 Dan Gillerman, Israeli diplomat, 13th Permanent Representative of Israel to the United Nations
 Nahum Barnea, Israeli journalist
 Assaf Hefetz, Israeli police commissioner
 Naomi Gal, Israeli writer
 Yossi Abulafia, Israeli writer, graphic artist, and director
 Doron Rubin, Israeli general, commander of the IDF headquarters for special operations (died 2018)
 David Tartakover, Israeli graphic designer and political activist
 Yasser Abed Rabbo, Palestinian Arab politician, member of the PLO executive

Notable deaths

 2 August – Berl Katznelson (born 1887), Russian-born Labor Zionist leader and journalist.
 7 November – Hannah Szenes (born 1921), Hungarian-born Palestinian Jewish poet, who served as a paratrooper during World War II for the British Army.
 18 November – Enzo Sereni (born 1905), Italian-born Palestinian Jew, who served as a paratrooper during World War II for the British Army.

 
Mandatory Palestine
Years in Mandatory Palestine
Mandatory Palestine in World War II